This is a list of notable Haitian Americans, including both original immigrants who obtained American citizenship and their American descendants.

To be included in this list, the person must have a Wikipedia article showing they are Haitian American, or have references showing they are Haitian American and are notable.

Academics
Michel DeGraff, tenured professor at the Massachusetts Institute of Technology and a founding member of the Haitian Creole Academy
Charles L. Reason, the first Black college professor in the United States; mathematician and linguist

Artists
John James Audubon, painter
Jean-Michel Basquiat, artist
Edouard Duval-Carrié, painter and sculptor
Vladimir Cybil Charlier, visual artist
Paul Gardère, visual artist
Jackson Georges, painter, whose works have been on exhibit at the World Trade Art Gallery, the United Nations, and Mehu Gallery
Edmonia Lewis, sculptor who gained fame and recognition in the international fine arts world
Patrick H. Reason, engraver
Sacha Thébaud (1934-2004), aka "Tebó", artist, sculptor, architect, furniture designer born in Haiti and known for encaustics in international contemporary fine art
Didier William, mixed-media painter
Ligel Lambert, mixed-media painter & Educator

Business
 Hurby Azor, hip-hop music producer
 Jean-Claude Brizard, former CEO of Chicago Public Schools
 Karen Civil, digital marketing strategist, entrepreneur, author; CEO of KarenCivil.com, Live Civil & CMO of Marathon Agency
 Suzanne de Passe, television, music and film producer; co-chairman of de Passe Jones Entertainment Group
 Mignon Faget, fine jewelry designer
 Reggie Fils-Aimé, former president of Nintendo America
 Ralph Gilles, automobile designer (Chrysler 300)
 Viter Juste, businessman, community leader and activist
 Danielle Laraque-Arena, first woman President of the State University of New York Upstate Medical University
 Monique Péan, fine jewelry designer
 Harve Pierre, President of Sean "Diddy" Combs' Bad Boy record company
 James Rosemond, former businessman involved in the rap music industry
 Mona Scott, CEO of Monami Entertainment
 Dumarsais Simeus, owner of Simeus Foods
Vince Valholla, hip-hop music producer
Steven Victor, record executive, artist manager, music publisher, and A&R representative.

Culinary arts
Vanessa Cantave, co-founder and executive chef of the catering company Yum Yum

Crime
Kendall Francois, serial killer
James Rosemond, "Jimmy Henchman", former businessman involved in the rap music industry; convicted drug trafficker
Haitian Jack, "Jacques Agnant"  A Haitian who had an infamous beef with American rapper  Tupac Shakur(2Pac)

Entertainment

Broadcasting
Vladimir Duthiers, television news broadcaster
Carmelau Monestime, community leader and Haitian Creole radio broadcaster
Liliane Pierre Paul, Haitian radio journalist who is  famous  for  having a political dispute with Haitian Kompa Artist turned politician Michel Martelly.

Dancers
Jean-Léon Destiné, dancer and choreographer
Emmanuel Pierre-Antoine, dancer

Films and TV
Nadege August, actress
Alisha Wainwright, actress
Marlyne Barrett, actress
Angelique Bates, actress best known for the Nickelodeon sketch-comedy series All That
Garcelle Beauvais, actress, singer, model
Cleveland Berto, actor
Michelle Buteau, stand-up comedian, actor
Gabriel Casseus, actor
Da'Vinchi, actor and rapper
Suzanne de Passe, television, music and film producer
Alex Désert, actor
Gary Dourdan, actor
Mike Estime, actor
Susan Fales-Hill, television producer, author, screenwriter 
Abner Genece, award-winning actor
Hugues Gentillon, film director, screenwriter, and producer
Meta Golding, actress
Frantz G. Saint Louis Jr., actor
Jamie Hector, actor
Nikki M. James, Tony Award-winning actress and singer
Kyle Jean-Baptiste, youngest actor and first black American actor to be cast as Jean Valjean in Les Misérables on Broadway
Jimmy Jean-Louis, actor
Vicky Jeudy, actress
Jean-Claude La Marre, television actor, director, and film and writer
Jerry Lamothe, screenwriter, director, producer, and actor
Sal Masekela, television host, sports commentator, actor, and singer
Trina McGee-Davis, actress
Moxiie, singer
Natalie Paul, actress
Sharon Pierre-Louis, actress
Josephine Premice, actress
Sandra Prosper, actress
Lela Rochon, actress
Luka Sabbat, actor and model
Eric André, actor and comedian (father is a Haitian immigrant)
Sifrael Wèmonchè, actor and comedian

Models
 Joanne Borgella, fashion model
 Mama Cax, fashion model, and disabled rights activist
 Alexandra Cheron, model
 Daphnée Duplaix, actress, model and former Playboy playmate
 Tyrone Edmond, fashion model
Ralph Souffrant, fashion model
 Marjorie Vincent, Miss America 1991

Music
21 Savage, rapper (paternal grandfather was of a Haitian descent)
Gaelle Adisson, singer
Jean Beauvoir, multi-Platinum singer, producer and songwriter.
Kodak Black, rapper
Elijah Blake, songwriter and contemporary R&B musician
Jean-Paul Bourelly, jazz fusion and blues rock guitarist
Bibi Bourelly, singer and daughter of Jean-Paul Bourelly
Won-G Bruny, rapper and entrepreneur
Capone, rapper
Alan Cavé, kompa singer
Andrew Cyrille, jazz drummer
Jason Derulo, singer, songwriter
Flipp Dinero, rapper
Louis Moreau Gottschalk, composer and pianist
Bigga Haitian, reggae musician
Hoax, alternative rock band including Frantz N. Cesar of Haitian and Puerto Rican descent
Lee Holdridge, multi-award-winning Haitian-born composer and orchestrator
Wyclef Jean, Grammy Award-winning Haitian rapper, musician and actor.
J-Live, rapper, DJ and producer
Jacki-O, rapper
J. Rosamond Johnson, composer and singer during the Harlem Renaissance
David Jude Jolicoeur, also known as "Trugoy the Dove"; rapper from De La Soul
Kangol Kid, rapper, UTFO
Rich The Kid, rapper
DJ Whoo Kid, DJ, producer
Steph Lecor, singer
Maxwell, Grammy Award-winning singer
Mach-Hommy, rapper
Leyla McCalla, cellist with the string band Carolina Chocolate Drops
Travie McCoy, lead singer of the band Gym Class Heroes
Woodson Michel, singer-songwriter, record producer and actor
Teri Moïse, singer
Michel Mauléart Monton, composer; notable for composing the classic song choucoune (known as "yellow bird" in the English version)
Richard Auguste Morse, founder of a mizik rasin band, RAM, named after his initials
Jimmy O, rapper
Pras, Grammy Award-winning rapper and founded of The Fugees; actor
Riva Nyri Précil, singer
Qwote, singer
Dawn Richard, singer
Devyn Rose, singer
Daniel Bernard Roumain, composer, musician
Cécile McLorin Salvant, Grammy Award-winning jazz singer
Melky Sedeck, contemporary R&B duo
Smitty, rapper
Sol, rapper
Sergio Sylvestre, singer
MC Tee, rapper and co-founder of Mantronix
Jon Theodore, former drummer of The Mars Volta, current drummer for Queens of the Stone Age
Torch, rapper 
Pastor Troy, rapper
Black Violin, musical duo
Saigon, rapper
Sha Money XL, producer
Tony Yayo, rapper
Vince Staples, rapper
Sheff G, rapper of Haitian and Trinidadian descent
Casanova, rapper of Jamaican and Haitian descent
Mig Arogan (rapper), rapper

Sports

Basketball
Jeff Adrien, undrafted NBA free agent
Zach Auguste, undrafted NBA free agent, former Notre Dame basketball player
Kervin Bristol, professional basketball player currently playing for the KK Włocławek of the Polish Basketball League
Nadine Domond, former professional basketball player
Quincy Douby, former Sacramento Kings NBA guard and current Zhejiang Golden Bulls CBA player
Mario Elie, former Houston Rockets NBA guard
Marie Ferdinand-Harris, first Haitian American WNBA player drafted; former Phoenix Mercury guard
Blake Griffin, member of the Los Angeles Clippers after being drafted 1st in the 2009 NBA draft
Taylor Griffin, drafted by the Phoenix Suns
Nerlens Noel, member of the Philadelphia Sixers after being drafted 6th in the 2013 NBA draft
Eniel Polynice, member of the Atleticos de San German in the BSN of Puerto Rico
Matisse Thybulle, 20th selection of the 2019 NBA draft.

Boxing
Andre Berto, professional boxer, 2004 Haitian Olympian, two-time welterweight champion
Fernando Guerrero, Haitian-Dominican-born boxer
Erickson Lubin, professional boxer
Melissa St. Vil, women's lightweight boxer
Patrick Day, Haitian-American boxer (born in the U.S. (Freeport, NY) to Haitian parents). He was geared to boxing by his Haitian parents in order to prevent neighborhood thugs and bullies from attacking their son, since many Haitian kids face bullying and harassment in school because of language barriers, anti-immigrant sentiments and culture difference.

Football
Mackensie Alexander, current cornerback for the Minnesota Vikings
Stanley Arnoux, former linebacker for the New Orleans Saints
Cliff Avril, current defensive end for the Seattle Seahawks
D'Anthony Batiste, former offensive tackle for the Arizona Cardinals
Mackenzy Bernadeau, guard for the Dallas Cowboys
Giovani Bernard, current running back for Cincinnati Bengals 
Yvenson Bernard, former running back for the St. Louis Rams, and Seattle Seahawks
Jacques Cesaire, former defensive end for the San Diego Chargers
Gosder Cherilus, current offensive tackle for the Tampa Bay Buccaneers
Jason Chery, free agent wide receiver
Stalin Colinet, former defensive end/tackle
Antonio Cromartie, current cornerback for the New York Jets 
Da'Mon Cromartie-Smith, current safety for the Pittsburgh Steelers
Marcell Dareus, nose tackle for the Buffalo Bills
Louis Delmas, current safety for the Detroit Lions
Pierre Desir, current cornerback the Cleveland Browns
Marc Dile, former guard/tackle for the Tampa Bay Buccaneers
Jayson DiManche, current outside linebacker for the Cincinnati Bengals
Leger Douzable, defensive end for the New York Jets
Vladimir Ducasse, current offensive tackle for the Baltimore Ravens
Elvis Dumervil, current defensive end for the San Francisco 49ers 
Dominique Easley, defensive tackle for the New England Patriots
Terrence Fede, defensive end for the Miami Dolphins
Deondre Francois, collegiate quarterback for the Florida State Seminoles
Junior Galette, current linebacker for the Washington Redskins
Pierre Garçon, current wide receiver for the San Francisco 49ers
Ron Girault, former safety
Josh Gordon, wide receiver for the Cleveland Browns
Stanley Jean-Baptiste, current cornerback for the Seattle Seahawks
Ricky Jean-Francois, current defensive tackle for the Washington Redskins
Max Jean-Gilles, former offensive guard for the Philadelphia Eagles
Lemuel Jeanpierre, guard and center for the Seattle Seahawks
Rashad Jeanty, former linebacker for the Cincinnati Bengals and current defensive lineman for the Edmonton Eskimos of the CFL
Jerry Jeudy, wide receiver for the Denver Broncos
Carlos Joseph, former offensive tackle for the San Diego Chargers
Davin Joseph, current offensive guard for the Tampa Bay Buccaneers
Frantz Joseph, American Canadian football player
Johnathan Joseph, current cornerback for the Houston Texans
Karl Joseph, current safety for the Oakland Raiders
William Joseph, former defensive tackle for the New York Giants
Steve Josue, former linebacker
Emmanuel Lamur, current linebacker for the Minnesota Vikings
Sammuel Lamur, former Tampa Bay Buccaneers and current free agent linebacker
Corey Lemonier, defensive linebacker for the New York Jets
Corey Liuget, defensive end for the Los Angeles Chargers
Henry McDonald, played Rochester Jeffersons from 1911 until 1917; one of the best known black American pro players during the era prior to the formation of the National Football League in 1920
Whitney Mercilus, current linebacker for the Houston Texans
Sony Michel, running back
Vernand Morency, former running back for the Houston Texans (2005–2006) and Green Bay Packers (2006–2007)
Steve Octavien, former linebacker for the Cleveland Browns and current linebacker for the Omaha Nighthawks  of the UFL
Olsen Pierre, free agent defensive end 
Kevin Pierre-Louis, linebacker for the Seattle Seahawks
Jason Pierre-Paul, current defensive end for the New York Giants 
Dominique Rodgers-Cromartie, current cornerback for the New York Giants
Jonal Saint-Dic, former defensive end for the Kansas City Chiefs (2008)
Greg Senat, offensive tackle for the Kansas City Chiefs
Pierre Thomas, former running back for the New Orleans Saints 
Fitzgerald Toussaint, running back for the Pittsburgh Steelers
Jonathan Vilma, former linebacker for the New Orleans Saints

Martial artists
James Edson Berto, MMA fighter
Ovince St. Preux, mixed martial artist; competes in the Light Heavyweight division for the UFC
Adler Volmar, judoka
Neil Magny, mixed martial artist; competes in the Welterweight division of the UFC

Soccer
Jozy Altidore, soccer player for Toronto FC
Gilbert Bayonne, soccer player
John Boulos, soccer player; is in the US National Soccer Hall of Fame
Kimberly Boulos, soccer player
Joenal Castma, retired soccer player; played in the US and Poland
Steward Ceus, soccer player
Ronil Dufrene, retired soccer player
Derrick Etienne, soccer player
Pat Fidelia, retired soccer player
Joe Gaetjens, member of the 1950 World Cup US National Team
Zachary Herivaux, soccer player
Andrew Jean-Baptiste, soccer player
Stefan Jerome, soccer player
Jacques LaDouceur, retired soccer player
Jerrod Laventure, soccer player, forward (striker) for Red Bull New York)
Benji Michel, soccer player
Fafà Picault, soccer player
Jerry Saint-Vil, soccer player
Brian Sylvestre, soccer player
Sébastien Thurière, soccer player

Sprinters and runners

Dudley Dorival, Olympic hurdler
Wadeline Jonathas, Olympic sprinter
Nadine Faustin-Parker, Olympic hurdler who competed for Haiti in the Olympics in Sydney (2000), Athens (2004), and Beijing (2008)
Moise Joseph, middle-distance runner; competed in the 2004 Olympic Games in Athens
Barbara Pierre, track and field sprint athlete in the Pan American Games
Marlena Wesh, sprinter competing in the 2012 Summer Olympics for Haiti
Angie Annelus, sprinter finalist at the 2019 World Athletics Championships

Tennis
Ronald Agénor, professional tennis player
Victoria Duval, professional tennis player
Jennifer Elie, professional tennis player
Naomi Osaka, professional tennis player

Other sports
Claude-Alix Bertrand, captain of the Haiti Polo Team
Francis Bouillon, professional hockey player
Dayana Cadeau, Haitian-born Canadian American professional bodybuilder
Shad Gaspard, WWE professional wrestler
Haiti Kid, retired WWF professional wrestler; had dwarfism
Samyr Laine, Olympic triple jumper; competed for Haiti at the 2012 Summer Olympics
 Al Silvera (1935–2002), major league baseball player
Rodney St. Cloud, professional bodybuilder
Touki Toussaint, professional baseball pitcher for the Atlanta Braves

Fashion designers
 Azéde Jean-Pierre
 Kerby Jean-Raymond, founder of the menswear label, Pyre Moss
Fabrice Simon, award-winning artist and fashion designer, best known for his handmade beaded dresses

Historical personalities
W. E. B. Du Bois, civil rights activist, first person of African descent to earn a doctorate at Harvard
Jeremiah Hamilton, Wall Street broker noted as "the only black millionaire in New York" about a decade before the American Civil War
Jean-Jacob Jeudy, activist, politician and currently a soldier in the United States Army
Viter Juste, coined the name "Little Haiti" for the neighborhood in Miami, Florida which is a center of the Haitian American community in Florida; considered the father of the community in Miami
Jean Baptiste Point du Sable, founder of the city of Chicago
Fred Staten, Haitian-born nightclub performer and infamous Voodoo King of New Orleans, known as Chicken Man
Charles Terres Weymann, racing pilot; flew for Nieuport during World War I as a test pilot; was awarded the rank of Chevalier of the Legion of Honour

Lawyers
Combat Jack, hip hop music attorney and executive
Edwin Warren Moïse, lawyer, physician and Confederate States of America
Karl Racine, first elected Attorney General of the District of Columbia
Mildred Trouillot, lawyer who married Jean-Bertrand Aristide

Literature
Yamiche Alcindor, journalist
Lylah M. Alphonse, news editor
Elsie Augustave, author
Dean Baquet, Pulitzer Prize-winning American journalist and the executive editor of The New York Times
Steve Canal, author
Jacqueline Charles, journalist
Anne-Christine d'Adesky, journalist and activist
Edwidge Danticat, author
Donna Denizé, poet and award-winning teacher
Joel Dreyfuss, journalist, editor, and writer
Roxane Gay, writer
Nathalie Handal, award-winning poet, writer, and playwright
Sacha Jenkins, journalist
James Weldon Johnson, author, and civil rights activist
Peniel E. Joseph, historian
Josaphat-Robert Large, writer
Dimitry Elias Léger, novelist and essayist
Roland Martin, journalist and syndicated columnist
Marilene Phipps, poet, painter, and short story writer
Alvin Francis Poussaint, author
Victor Séjour, writer
Luisah Teish, author
Gina Athena Ulysse, poet

Science
Gerard A. Alphonse, electrical engineer, physicist and research scientist; 2005 president of the United States division of the Institute of Electrical and Electronics Engineers (IEEE)
Louis Gustave De Russy, engineer and U.S. army officer
John James Audubon, naturalist
Jean Charles Faget, physician
Henri Ford, pediatric surgeon
Linda Marc, public health researcher
David Malebranche, physician working in the field of HIV/AIDS
Hermanie Pierre, Civil and Environmental Engineer
Dr. Ashley Pierre PhD,BCBA,
(Board Certified Behavior Analyst)
Dr. Pierre uses the principles of Applied Behavior Analysis  Science (ABA) to teach and promote behavior change for all.

Political figures
Mack Bernard, member of the Florida House of Representatives
Rodneyse Bichotte, first Haitian American elected in New York City, representing 42nd District of the New York State Assembly
André Birotte Jr., United States district judge for the United States District Court for the Central District of California
Ronald Brise, Florida House of Representatives
Eugene Bullard, first black American military pilot
Daphne Campbell, Democratic member of the Florida House of Representatives
Josaphat Celestin, former Mayor of North Miami, Florida, and first Haitian American elected mayor of a sizable U.S. city
Auguste Davezac, diplomat who served twice as United States Ambassador to the Netherlands
Rodolphe Desdunes, civil rights activist and militiaman involved in the Battle of Liberty Place
René Edward De Russy, Brevet Brigadier General in the United States Army
Jules DeMun, aristocrat
Philippe Derose, North Miami Beach councilman
Mathieu Eugene, New York City councilman
Phara Souffrant Forrest, New York Assemblywoman-elect and member of the Democratic Socialists of America
Linda Dorcena Forry, Massachusetts State Senator
M. Rony Francois, public health director of Georgia
Patrick Gaspard, Director of the White House Office of Political Affairs (2009–2012), United States Ambassador to South Africa (2013–2016)
Richard Howell Gleaves, 55th Lieutenant Governor of South Carolina
Lody Jean, First Haitian-American woman to be appointed to and serve on Florida's 11th Circuit Court
Kimberly Jean-Pierre, Member of the New York Assembly from the 11th District
Jean Jeudy, New Hampshire State Representative
Ruthzee Louijeune, Member of the Boston City Council at-large
Jacques Jiha, New York City Commissioner of Finance
Smith Joseph, mayor of North Miami
Harry LaRosiliere, 38th mayor of Plano, Texas
Raymond Lohier, became the first Haitian American to be confirmed (unanimously) by the United States Senate as a Judge for the U.S. Court of Appeals, Second Circuit in New York
Mia Love, first Haitian-American and first black Republican woman in Congress; U.S. House of Representative for Utah's 4th district and former mayor of Saratoga Springs, Utah
Sheila Cherfilus-McCormick, first Haitian-American Democratic woman in Congress; U.S. House of Representative for Florida's 20th district
Rudy Moise, retired Colonel of the United States Air Force, and politician
Jean Monestime, first Haitian American to serve on the Miami-Dade County Commission
Andre Pierre, former Democratic mayor of North Miami, Florida
Pierre-Richard Prosper, ambassador, lawyer, prosecutor and government official
Karl Racine, first elected Attorney General of the District of Columbia
Joseph Rainey, Republican member of the South Carolina House of Representatives
Alonzo J. Ransier, 54th Lieutenant Governor of South Carolina
Kwame Raoul, 42nd Attorney General of Illinois
Yolly Roberson, Florida State Representative
Marie St. Fleur, former Massachusetts State Representative
Michaelle C. Solages, represents the 22nd district in the New York State Assembly
Brandon Tatum, former police officer, former/undrafted football player and conservative commentator

Religion
John J. Chanche, first Roman Catholic Bishop of Natchez, 1841-1852
Mother Mary Lange, foundress of the Oblate Sisters of Providence, Servant of God
Mama Lola, Vodou priestess
Pierre Toussaint, beatified candidate for sainthood in the Roman Catholic Church

Others
Stanley Barbot, radio personality based in New York City
Jean-Robert Bellande, professional poker player, reality TV contestant, nightclub owner and promoter
Patrick Dorismond, police abuse victim; brother of reggae artist Bigga Haitian
Jeff Gardere, talk show host, psychiatrist and author
 
Karine Jean-Pierre, Senior Advisor and National Spokesman for MoveOn.org 
Abner Louima, police abuse victim
Sofia Rinvil, Philanthropist, Advocate, and Global Goals Ambassador

See also

 List of Haitians
 List of Haitian Canadians
 List of Louisiana Creoles
 Haitian diaspora

References

 
Lists of American people by ethnic or national origin
Lists of people by ethnicity
American